Sara Ghomi Marzdashti (born 20 August 1987), is an Iranian footballer who plays as a forward for Heyat Football Alborz team and the Iranian national team.

She started her football career in 2005 with Malavan Bandar Anzali club and played for Malavan team until late 2015, when the women's team of Malavan got disbanded. Through her years in Malavan, she has been chosen as the top goalscorer of Iran premier league five times. She is the most prolific Iranian female footballer of all time, having scored 238 goals.

Early life 
Ghomi had interest in football from a very young age but since women's football wasn't activated in Iran then, she started playing volleyball. In 1999–2000 after discovering there was a women's futsal team in her region of Rasht, Gilan Province, she focused on futsal and dropped volleyball.

In early 2005, Malavan's women's team was founded and Ghomi joined the club after passing the entrance test. She played for Malavan about 11 years until the team was disbanded. Ghomi stated in an interview that the resolution of the Malavan women's team broke her heart.

International career 

Due to her goal-scoring skills, she was first invited to the national team in 2012. Even though her main position is forward, for the national team she plays as a left midfielder.

International goals

Career statistics

Club

Honours

Club 
Malavan Bandar Anzali
Kowsar Women Football League: 
runner-up 2012–13, runner-up 2013–14, runner-up 2014–15, runner-up 2015–16

Shahrdari Bam 
Kowsar Women Football League: 
runner-up 2016–17

Individual  
Kowsar Women Football League 
Top Goalscorer: 2012–13, 2013–14, 2014–15, 2015–16

Personal life 
Ghomi is a fan of Barcelona S.C. and Messi. Ali Karimi is her favourite footballer in Iran. In an interview, she said when she was a kid she wanted to be a sport teacher, but now she prefers not to be since she is a professional footballer now.

References

External links
 Iran player profile
 

1987 births
Living people
Iranian women's footballers
Iranian women's futsal players
Iran women's international footballers
Women's association football forwards
People from Rasht
Sportspeople from Gilan province
21st-century Iranian women